Bakit Hindi Ka Crush ng Crush Mo? is a book written by Ramon Bautista and was published by PSICOM Publishing Inc. it is a compilation of the author's answers to love questions posted on his website. The novel was released in 2012 and converted into a movie with the same name released in July 2013 under Star Cinema.

Plot

The story starts when a record company, A&A Records, has gone down to the bottom in the music industry. Miguel Prieto has passed the company to his son, Alex Prieto. Sandy Veloso, an ugly duck darling who has a boyfriend who is Edgardo Salazar. She becomes brokenhearted when she saw her boyfriend with a beautiful girl. Sandy is also a worker in A&A Records who is the personal assistant of Pamela. Alex finds a solution when the workers suggest Sandy because she has much knowledge in the music industry. First, Sandy suggests a band named Banda ni Kleggy. Next, she suggests Tangerine, a singer whose career has gone down.

After that, Sandy suggests Jireh Lim. But after their efforts to make the company down, they failed. Alex realizes that he likes Sandy.

Ramon Bautista states the reasons why your crush has no crush on you. The following are:

 he/she dislikes your handsomeness and your beauty
 your attitude is bad
 he/she didn't like your favorite television shows
 your horoscopes are not compatible
 your age is not suitable for his/her age
 one of you has a relationship
 if there is no relationship, he/she has a crush on others

At the end of the movie, which is of the same title, Alex Prieto kisses Sandy Veloso.

Writing

Ramon Bautista's inspiration was the people who become crazy because of love. He said that people who become crazy because of love will have a special someone because they will not worry about love after their break-ups.

Film Adaptation

Star Cinema has announced that Kim Chiu and Xian Lim will be the tandem for the Star Cinema's twentieth anniversary film. Ramon Bautista, author and writer has given the copyrights to the Star Cinema, 6 months before the release of the movie. Kim Chui portrays as Sandy Veloso and Xian Lim as Alex Prieto. The film got a box-office hit with PHP 102,600,634 as domestic gross and PHP 98,784,042 for international gross converted to a 42 peso-mark for a total of PHP 201,384,676 in the box-office for 3 weeks.

References

2012 novels
Philippine romance novels
Tagalog-language novels
Novels adapted into films